Thompson Rivers University Faculty of Law is the school of law of Thompson Rivers University in Kamloops, British Columbia, Canada.  It offers a three-year Juris Doctor degree accredited by the Federation of Law Societies of Canada.  Its degree is recognized in all common law provinces and Territories in Canada and by other common law jurisdictions.

History

TRU Faculty of Law officially opened to students on September 6, 2011 with a first year class of 75 students and 10 faculty members.  The ceremonial opening was attended by several dignitaries, including the Honourable Chief Justice Lance Finch, former BC Attorney General Wally Oppal, Q.C., and CBA BC Chapter President Sharon Matthews, among many others.

Location

The Faculty of Law is currently housed in the third and fourth floor of the Old Main building of Thompson Rivers University. The two floors opened its doors in time for the admitting class of 2014-2015.

Old Main revitalization

In 2014, the Faculty of Law was moved to the expanded and remodeled Old Main building.  Old Main's revitalization was inspired by the region’s most prominent landmarks (notably Mt. Peter and Paul). It added 40,000 square feet of learning, library and student spaces.

Affiliation with the University of Calgary 

TRU Law adopted University of Calgary's Faculty of Law curriculum on May 1, 2010 in advance of its opening in Fall 2011.  According to former U of C Faculty of Law Dean Alastair Lucas, the U of C's focus on natural resources, energy, and environmental law is "uniquely suited to academic priorities at TRU and we are excited to provide them together with a program that focuses on practical legal skills instruction."

Courses

TRU Law offers a traditional JD program, approved by the Federation of Law Societies of Canada. A mandatory first-year curriculum is followed by advanced legal study in upper years, which includes compulsory courses in Ethical Lawyering, Administrative Law, Civil Procedure and Business Associations.  It also offers a broad array of electives including a number of very unique ones not offered elsewhere in Canada.

Student organizations
The primary student organization is the TRU Society of Law Students.  Established in October 2011, the Society has adopted a series of strategic priorities aimed at enriching and supporting the student experience.  A number of clubs have been established under the TRU SLS banner, 'TRU Oral Advocacy Club', 'TRU Lawcapellants', 'TRU South Asian Law Students Association, TRU Indigenous Law Students Association, "Asia Pacific Law Students Association" and Black Law Students' Association'', Criminal Law Club, Hiking Club, Digital Media Entertainment, Business Law Society, Labour and Employment Law Club, Law Needs Feminism Because-TRU Chapter, Crib Club, Golf Club, Legal Innovation Association, OutLaws, Securities Law Club, Science and Law Club, Law Hockey club, Law Rugby, TRU Animal Law Advocacy and others.  There are also a number of law student-comprised sports teams that compete in the various TRU recreation leagues.

The Faculty of Law also participates in the CBA BC Branch's student mentorship program.  This program is designed to match law students with lawyers willing to share their experience and insight into the practice of law.

Community Legal Clinic

The Thompson Rivers University Community Legal Clinic is the first student-staffed free legal clinic in the BC Interior. Students work under the guidance of 3 supervising lawyers to provide legal assistance and advice in a range of areas to those who would otherwise be unable to afford legal assistance.

Recognition
In 2015, a team from the TRU Faculty of Law defeated teams from the University of British Columbia and the University of Victoria to win the Begbie Trophy at the BC Law Schools Competitive Moot.

Awards and prizes
TRU Law offers a broad array of scholarships, bursaries and course prizes, including entrance scholarships funded by the Canadian Bar Association, BC Branch, The Law Foundation of British Columbia, Fulton & Company LLP, and Gregory S. Pun Q.Q.

References

External links 
 Thompson Rivers University Faculty of Law

Faculty of Law
Law schools in Canada
Educational institutions established in 2011
2011 establishments in British Columbia